Melinda Metz (born March 7, 1962) is an American author of young adult books as well as a series for adults. Her series Roswell High, about teenage aliens, serves as the basis of The WB television series Roswell and The CW television series Roswell, New Mexico.

Career 
Metz's Roswell High series was published from 1998 to 2000 and consists of ten books. Her series Fingerprints, about a psychic girl who reads thoughts from fingerprints, was published from 2001 to 2002 and consists of seven books.

Metz has also written books for several book series, including Buffy the Vampire Slayer, The New Adventures of Mary-Kate and Ashley Olsen, Ghosts of Fear Street, and Goosebumps Presents. She sometimes collaborates with fellow author Laura J. Burns, with whom she wrote the book series based on the Everwood TV series, and the Wright and Wong teen detective series, and the Vampire Beach series under the pseudonym of Alex Duval. Metz was also the ghostwriter for two books in the Animorphs series.

Works

Roswell High
Roswell High is a young adult book series written by Melinda Metz and published by Pocket Books. The 10-book series chronicles the adventures of three teen aliens and their human friends, who attend the fictional Ulysses F. Olsen High in Roswell, New Mexico. The Roswell High books served as inspiration for the television series Roswell (1999–2002), also known as Roswell High in some countries, which in turn spawned a number of spin-off books of its own. The second adaptation was re-imagining for the television series Roswell, New Mexico.

Main articles: Roswell High, Roswell (TV series), Roswell, New Mexico (TV series)

Book listThe OutsiderThe Wild OneThe SeekerThe WatcherThe IntruderThe StowawayThe VanishedThe RebelThe Dark OneThe SalvationFingerprintsFingerprints is a book series about high schooler Rachel "Rae" Voight who develops a psychic ability; when she touches a fingerprint, she can "hear" the person's thought. When Rae discovers someone out to kill her, she must find facts about the past to protect herself. She only has the help of her friends; Anthony, who knows about her mysterious abilities, and Yana, who doesn't ask awkward questions.

Book listGifted TouchHauntedTrust MeSecretsBetrayedRevelationsPaybackOtherAnimorphs #29: The Sickness (Ghostwritten) (1999)Animorphs #34: The Prophecy (Ghostwritten) (1999)Case of the Creepy Castle (2000)Raven's Point (2004) Talk to the Paw (2018) The Secret Life of Mac (2019)

With Laura J. Burns

"Abomination, Beauport, Brittany, France, 1320" in Tales of the Slayer, Vol. 2 (2003)
Buffy the Vampire Slayer: Apocalypse Memories (2004)
Buffy the Vampire Slayer: Colony (2005)Everwood: First Impressions (2004)Everwood: Making Choices (2004)Everwood: Worlds Apart (2005)Everwood: Change of Plans (2005)Wright and WongCraveSacrifice  I Do Not Trust You''

References

External links
Interview with Laura J. Burns and Melinda Metz
Roswell High - Books guide with summaries, small reviews and characters description

Living people
American writers of young adult literature
American fantasy writers
20th-century American novelists
21st-century American novelists
20th-century American women writers
21st-century American women writers
Women science fiction and fantasy writers
American women novelists
Women writers of young adult literature
1962 births
Writers of young adult science fiction